Hydrobacter is a Gram-negative genus of bacteria from the family of Chitinophagaceae with one known species (Hydrobacter penzbergensis). Hydrobacter penzbergensis  has been isolated from a purified water system from Roche Diagnostics GmbH in Penzberg in Germany.

References

Chitinophagia
Bacteria genera
Monotypic bacteria genera
Taxa described in 2015